The  is an armored personnel carrier that entered service with Japan Ground Self-Defense Force in 1960.

Development
Work began in 1956 on development of a fully tracked armored personnel carrier (APC) to equip the Japan Ground Self-Defense Force, with two prototypes being completed by Komatsu (the SU-I) and by Mitsubishi (the SU-II) in 1957. These two prototypes were evaluated against the American M59. They were followed by a second series of 11 prototypes, including both APCs and carriers for 81-mm and 107-mm mortars, with a third series of four prototypes being completed and tested in 1959.

Initial production orders were placed in 1959, and the type was standardised in 1960 as the Type 60 Armored Personnel Carrier. About 430 were built.

Description
The Type 60 had a welded steel hull, with a sloped Glacis plate and vertical hull sides and rear. It was operated by a crew of four (driver, bow gunner, commander and gunner). The driver sat at the front-right of the hull, with the bow gunner, armed with a single 7.62 mm M1919 Browning machine gun sitting to his left. The commander sat behind and between the bow gunner and driver, while the gunner sat behind and to the right of the commander, operating a 0.5 in (12.7 mm) M2 Browning machine gun mounted of the vehicle's roof. Six troops were carried in a compartment at the rear of the hull, accessed by two doors at the back of the vehicle. Some Type 60 APCs were fitted with two KAM-3D wire-guided anti-tank missiles on the rear of the hull.

The vehicle was powered by a  Mitisubishi 8 HA 21 WT V8 diesel engine mounted behind the bow gunner. Its tracks were fitted with five road wheels, with a drive wheel at the front and an idler wheel at the rear. Torsion bar suspension was fitted. No night vision equipment or NBC protection was fitted.

Service
The Type 60 was superseded by the Type 73 Armored Personnel Carrier from 1974, but only 225 Type 73s were built, and the Type 60 continued in large scale use until the 2000s. Roles included training, with several Type 60s being modified to visually resemble the Soviet BMD-1 airborne infantry fighting vehicles. 303 Type 60s were listed as in service in 1998, with 33 remaining in service in 2005, but none were listed as in service in 2006.

Variants
SU 60 Basic Armored Personnel Carrier.
SV 60 81 mm mortar carrier. Carried a single 81 mm mortar with a range of  mounted in the back of the hull, with 24 mortar bombs carried and a crew of five. 18 built.
SX 60 107 mm (4.2-in) mortar carrier.
SY 60 Prototype 105 mm self-propelled howitzer. No production.

References 

Armoured personnel carriers of the Cold War
Tracked armoured personnel carriers
Cold War military equipment of Japan
Armoured personnel carriers of Japan
Komatsu Limited
Military vehicles introduced in the 1960s